The Monument to the Volhynia 27th Home Army Infantry Division is located in Skwerze Wołyńskim (Volyn Square) beside the main thoroughfare Trasa Armii Krajowej in northern Warsaw. It commemorates the contribution of the Armia Krajowa's 27th Infantry Division during World War II, especially fighting the Ukrainian Insurgent Army at the time of the Volhynia massacres.

The memorial was designed by sculptor  (who was born in Volhynia). It was unveiled on 12 September 1993. The monument is shaped like a large stone sword.

On the 13 July 2003 a set of 11 stone column "candles" was unveiled, commemorating the martyrdom of Poles from Volhynia's 11 counties, the victims of the Volhynia massacres. Each column has a coat of arms and a name of a county from Volhynia. The columns are terminated with a "wick" - the columns are illuminated from below with lights hidden in the pavement.

To the right of the monument is a bust of General Jan Wojciech Kiwerski, a leader of the infantry division, who died during the war.

Gallery

Bibliography 
 A view of the monument

Monuments and memorials in Warsaw
1993 establishments in Poland
1993 sculptures
Military memorials and cemeteries in Poland